Wilfred de Souza   (23 April 1927 – 4 September 2015) was a surgeon and politician from Goa, India. He served as Goa's  first Deputy Chief Minister of Goa and chief minister on three occasions when he was a member of the Indian National Congress and the Goa Rajiv Congress Party, during his third tenure.

Political career

Dr de Souza is credited, together with allies such as Govind Panvelcar, with the first Congress Party victory in Goa in 1980. From 1963 until 1979 Goan politics had been dominated by the regional parties, particularly the Maharashtrawadi Gomantak Party.

In July 1998 Dr de Souza formed the Goa Rajiv Congress Party as a splinter group of the INC. He was sworn in as Chief Minister for the third time on 30 July 1998 and remained in the post until 26 November 1998.

In 1999, Dr de Souza joined the Nationalist Congress Party and was its Goa president from 1999 to June 2009. During this period he was Deputy Chief Minister in a coalition government with the INC from February 2005 to June 2007. He failed to retain his seat in the 2007 assembly election.

After he left the party, Gurunath Kulkarni, national general secretary of the Nationalist Congress Party accused him of impeding the party's growth in Goa.

In 2007, he was appointed the Deputy Chairperson of the State Planning Board.

For the 2012 assembly election he was a member of the All India Trinamool Congress as head of the Goa branch of the party. During the election, he criticised the INC for corruption.

Background

He was born in Kampala, Uganda on 23 April 1927, to Dr. Tito Fermino de Souza and Alina Ana Maria de Souza, Ugandan Indian parents of Goan Catholic origin and descent who both immigrated from Anjuna, Goa.

He died on 4 September 2015 after a brief illness and prior to that, he was admitted in Manipal Hospital.

Educational qualifications
M.B.B.S. (Bombay University);
Fellow of the Royal College of Surgeons, England;
Fellow of the Royal College of Surgeons, Edinburgh;
Honorary Fellow of the International College of Surgeons;
Fellow of the Association of Surgeons of India.

Awards and achievements
 Commander, Grand Cross of the Order of Dom Infante Henriques – from the Government of Portugal at the hands of the President of Portugal, H.E.Mario Soares;
 Dr. B. C. Roy Award – as "Eminent Medical Man & Statesman" from the Medical Council of India at the hands of the President of India, H.E. Shri K.R. Narayanan;
 The Silver Elephant Award – for services to Scouts & Guides by the President of India;
 Sons of India – award from the society for Advanced Studies in Medical Sciences at the hands of Swami Brijendramandji, Head Ramkrishna Mission;
 Jawaharlal Nehru Excellence Award – given by Institute of Economic Studies, New Delhi;
 Indira Gandhi Solidarity Award – given by Indian Solidarity Council, New Delhi; Rajiv Gandhi Excellence Award, 1992;
 International Gold Star Award – by Industrial Economic Forum, New Delhi; Super Achievers of India Award by Front for National Progress;
 Glory of India International Award – by International Friendship Association of India;
 Gold Award – by Shiromani Institute;

In addition, he has worked in several hospitals in the UK 1957–1963; Consultant surgeon to Goa Medical College Panjim;
Asilo Hospital Mapuca; Hospicio Hospital Margao; Holy Cross Hospital, Mapuca; C.M.M. Memorial Hospital, Panjim. .

References

External links 

 Dr. Wilfred A. De Souza & Others vs Shri Tomazinho Cardozo Hon'Ble ... on 7 September 1998

Goans in science and technology
Indian surgeons
Fellows of the Royal College of Surgeons
Goan Catholics
Fellows of the Royal College of Surgeons of Edinburgh
Deputy chief ministers of Goa
Trinamool Congress politicians from Goa
Chief Ministers of Goa
Indian National Congress politicians from Goa
Goa Rajiv Congress Party politicians
Ugandan people of Indian descent
Nationalist Congress Party politicians from Goa
Indian Roman Catholics
Ugandan people of Goan descent
Dr. B. C. Roy Award winners
1927 births
2015 deaths
Chief ministers from Indian National Congress
People from Panaji
20th-century Indian medical doctors
Medical doctors from Goa
Ugandan Roman Catholics